Sutan Sjahrir (5 March 1909 – 9 April 1966) was an Indonesian politician, and revolutionary independence leader, who served as the first Prime Minister of Indonesia, from 1945 until 1947. Previously, he was a key Indonesian nationalist organizer in the 1930s and 1940s. Unlike some of his colleagues, he did not support the Japanese during the Japanese occupation and fought in the resistance against them. He was considered to be an idealist and an intellectual.

Born to a Minangkabau family, he studied at the University of Amsterdam, and later became a law student at the Leiden University. He became involved in Socialist politics, and Indonesia's struggle for independence, becoming a close associate of the older independence activist Mohammad Hatta, who would later become the first Vice President of Indonesia. During the Japanese occupation of the Dutch East Indies, Sjahrir fought in the resistance. Towards independence on 17 August 1945, he was involved in the Rengasdengklok Incident and the Proclamation of Independence. Following the release of his 1945 pamphlet "Our Struggle" ("Perjuangan Kita"), he was appointed Prime Minister of Indonesia by President Sukarno. As Prime Minister, he was one of the few Republican leaders acceptable to the Dutch government, due to his non-cooperative stance during the Japanese occupation. He also played a crucial role in negotiating the Linggadjati Agreement.

Sjahrir founded the Indonesian Socialist Party (PSI) in 1948 to politically oppose the Indonesian Communist Party (PKI). Although small, his party was very influential in the early post-independence years. However, Sjahrir's socialist party ultimately failed to win support and was later banned in 1960, after the party was suspected of being involved in the Revolutionary Government of the Republic of Indonesia rebellion. Sjahrir himself would eventually be arrested and imprisoned without trial in 1962. In 1965, he was released to seek medical treatment and was allowed to go to Zürich, Switzerland. There, he died on 9 April 1966. On the same day, through Presidential Decree No. 76/1966, Sjahrir was inaugurated as a National Hero of Indonesia.

Early life

Youth and family 

Sutan Sjahrir was born on 5 March 1909, in Padang Panjang, West Sumatra. He came from an ethnic-Minangkabau family, from what is today Koto Gadang, Agam Regency. His father, Muhammad Rasyad Maharajo Sutan, served as the Hoofd or Chief public prosecutor at the Landraad in Medan. While his mother, Siti Rabiah, came from Natal, in what is today South Tapanuli Regency.

Sjahrir's father had six different wives, with Sjahrir's mother being the fifth wife his father married. From his father's marriages, Sjahrir had 6 siblings. Two biological brothers, and four half-siblings. His two biological brothers were Soetan Sjahsam, who become an experienced businessman, and Soetan Noeralamsjah, who would become prosecutor and politician from the Great Indonesia Party (Parindra). He was also the half-brother of Rohana Kudus, an advocate for women's education and a journalist with the first feminist newspaper of Sumatra.

Early education 

Although from Padang Pandjang, Sjahrir's family lived in Medan, but he was often brought by his father to his grandmother's house in Koto Gadang, which has now become abandoned. Sjahrir attended the Europeesche Lagere School (ELS), before continuing to the Meer Uitgebreid Lager Onderwijs (MULO), in Medan. During his time at MULO, he was first introduced to works by authors such as Karl May. In 1926, he continued his education at the Algemene Middelbare School (AMS), in Bandung, West Java.

There, he joined the Indonesian Student Theater Association (Batovis) as a director, writer and actor. His earnings from there were used to fund the 'People's University' (Cahaya), which was a university co-founded by Sjahrir, to battle illiteracy and raise funds for the performance of patriotic plays in the Priangan countryside. Sjahrir completed his studies at the AMS in 1929, and continued his educatiton to the Netherlands, after receiving a scholarship.

Independence Struggle

Nationalist Student activist in the Netherlands
Sjahrir arrived in the Netherlands in 1929, enrolling first at the University of Amsterdam and later becoming a law student at Leiden University where he gained an appreciation for socialist principles. He was a part of several labor unions as he worked to support himself. He was briefly the secretary of the Perhimpoenan Indonesia (Indonesian Association), an organization of Indonesian students in the Netherlands. Sjahrir was also one of the co-founders of Jong Indonesie, an Indonesian youth association in lieu of the need of an association to assist in the development of Indonesian youth for further generations, only to change within a few years to Pemuda Indonesia. This, in particular, played an important role in the Youth Congress (Sumpah Pemuda), in which the association helped the congress itself to run. During his political activities as a student in the Netherlands he became a close associate of the older independence activist Mohammad Hatta, future vice-president of Indonesia. While he spent years in exile in the Banda Islands, he taught the local children to love their country and inspired them in many ways.

The Perhimpoenan Indonesia came under increasing communist influence, and Hatta and Sjahrir were both expelled in 1931. In a reaction to the intrigue by communist cells in the PI against Hatta and himself Sjahrir stayed calm and in character. In his memoirs their Dutch associate Sol Tas recalls: "He was not intimidated for one minute by official or quasi-official declarations, by communiques or other formulae, not afraid for one second of the maneuvers directed against him, and still less concerned for his reputation. That mixture of self-confidence and realism, that courage based on the absence of any ambition or vanity, marked the man."

Nationalist leader in the Dutch East Indies

Sjahrir had not finished his law degree, when Hatta sent Sjahrir ahead of him to the Dutch East Indies in 1931, to help set up the Indonesian National Party (PNI). Sjahrir was heavily involved in the Daulat Rajat, the newspaper of the new PNI. Within a relatively short time he developed from a representative of Hatta into a political and intellectual leader with his own standing. Both leaders were imprisoned in the Cipinang Penitentiary Institution by the Dutch in March 1934 and convicted for nationalist activities in November 1934, exiled to Boven-Digoel where they arrived March 1935, then to Banda a year later, and just before the Indies fell to the Japanese in 1941, to Sukabumi.

Resistance leader during the Japanese occupation
During the Japanese occupation of Indonesia he had little public role, apparently sick with tuberculosis, while he was actually one of the few independence leaders that was involved in the resistance movement against the Japanese occupation. Sukarno, Hatta and Sjahrir had in fact agreed that Sjahrir would go underground to organise the revolutionary resistance while the other 2 would continue their cooperation with the Japanese occupier.

Prime minister

At the height of chaos and violence during the early Bersiap period of the Indonesian revolution Sjahrir published an epoch-making pamphlet named 'Our Struggle'. Originally published in Dutch as 'Indonesische Overpeinzingen' ('Indonesian Musings'), it was soon thereafter translated into the Indonesian language as 'Perdjoeangan Kita' in 1945, and was then translated into the English language by Charles Wolf Jr. and named 'Out of Exile' published by John Day, New York, 1949. The English version contains a considerable amount of additional text. "Perhaps the high point of his career was the publication of his pamphlet 'Our Struggle'. Whoever reads that pamphlet today can scarcely comprehend what it demanded in insight and courage. For it appeared at a moment when the Indonesian masses, brought to the boiling point by the Japanese occupation and civil war, sought release in racist and other hysterical outbursts. Sjahrir's pamphlet went directly against this, and many must have felt his call for chivalry, for the understanding of other ethnic groups, as a personal attack." Sol Tas.

After writing his pamphlet he was appointed Prime Minister by President Sukarno in November 1945 and served until June 1947. Professor Wertheim describes Sjahrir's early accomplishments as Prime minister as follows: "...Sjahrir knows what he wants and will not be distracted by popular sentiment or circumstantiality. He is able to overturn a ministry fabricated by the Japanese and establish a new ministry of honest, fairly capable, fairly democratic and social minded men under his leadership. No small feat in revolutionary circumstances..."

Due to his non-cooperative stance during the Japanese occupation he was one of the few Republican leaders acceptable to the Dutch government during the early independence negotiations. In 1946 Sjahrir played a crucial role in negotiating the Linggadjati Agreement. Because his thoughts were ahead of his time he was often misunderstood and started to acquire internal political adversaries.

If we determine the value of Indonesia's freedom by its genuinely democratic quality, then in our political struggle vis-a-vis the outside world, it is for this inner content that we must strive. "The State of the Republic of Indonesia" is only a name we give to whatever content we intend and hope to provide. In 'Perdjoeangan Kita' (Our Struggle), October 1945, Sjahrir.

Political leader

Although Sjahrir was one of the most significant Indonesian politicians of his time, he did not engage in politics through a sense of vocation nor out of interest, but rather through a sense of duty to his country and compatriots and commitment to his democratic ideals. Described as an omnivorous intellectual Sjahrir had education at the heart of his passion. When he was appointed Prime Minister in 1945, he was the youngest prime minister in the world only being 36 years old.
 "I really find teaching the greatest work there is, for helping young people to shape themselves is one of the noblest tasks of society." Sutan Sjahrir.
 
Sjahrir founded the Indonesian Socialist Party (PSI) in 1948 to politically oppose the Indonesian Communist Party (PKI). Sutan's socialist party ultimately failed to win support and was later banned in 1960. Already in the mid 1930s Sjahrir warned for the tendency of socialists to be dragged into the notions of the extreme political left. Sjahrir described his fear of the trend of socialists to adopt ideas of communist absolutism as follows: "Those socialist activists, with all good intentions, suddenly and unnoticed become 'absolute' thinkers, 'absolutely' discarding freedom, 'absolutely' spitting on humanity and the rights of the individual.[...]They envision the terminus of human development as one huge military complex of extreme order and discipline [...]"

Although small, his party was very influential in the early post-independence years, because of the expertise and high education levels of its leaders. But the party performed poorly in the 1955 elections, partly due to the fact that the grassroots constituency at the time was unable to fully understand the concepts of social democracy Sjahrir was trying to convey.  It was banned by President Sukarno in August 1960 because of its support for a rebellion in Sumatra and his opposition to the president's policies.

Final years
In 1962 Sjahrir was jailed on alleged conspiracy charges for which he was never put on trial. Instead of fighting back and creating more conflicts, he chose to step back from politics and accept the consequences. During his imprisonment he suffered from high blood pressure and in 1965 had a stroke, losing his speech. He was sent to Zürich, Switzerland for treatment and died there in exile in 1966.

Legacy

Although a revolutionary opponent of Dutch colonialism his intellectual prowess was recognised by his adversaries and he remained highly respected in the Netherlands.  After his death in 1966 the former Dutch Prime-Minister Professor Schermerhorn commemorated Sjahrir in a public broadcast on national radio, calling him a "noble political warrior" with "high ideals" and expressing the hope that he will be recognised as such by next generations in Indonesia.

In the 21st century Sjahrir's legacy in Indonesia is being publicly rehabilitated.

In 2009 Indonesian Foreign Minister Hassan Wirajuda said: "He was a thinker, a founding father, a humanistic leader and a statesman. He should be a model for the young generation of Indonesians. His thoughts, his ideas and his spirit are still relevant today as we face global challenges in democracy and the economy."

See also
 List of prime ministers of Indonesia
 Sjahrir I Cabinet
 Sjahrir II Cabinet
 Sjahrir III Cabinet

Notes

References

Citations

Bibliography

External links

Our struggle (by) Sutan Sjahrir. Translated with an introduction by Benedict Arnold
 Sjahrir biography
 Sjahrir biography, History website
Transcript of a 1956 interview with Sutan Sjahrir
  Photo gallery of Sutan Sjahrir

1909 births
1966 deaths
People from Padang Panjang
People from West Sumatra
Indonesian Muslims
Minangkabau people
Leiden University alumni
National Heroes of Indonesia
Prime Ministers of Indonesia
Socialist Party of Indonesia politicians
People of the Indonesian National Revolution
Interior ministers of Indonesia
Foreign ministers of Indonesia
Indonesian independence activists
Boven-Digoel concentration camp detainees